Luis Russell (August 5, 1902 – December 11, 1963) was a pioneering Panamanian jazz pianist, orchestra leader, composer, and arranger.

Career
Luis Carl Russell was born on Careening Cay, near Bocas del Toro, Panama, in a family of African-Caribbean ancestry. His father was a music teacher, and Russell learned to play guitar, piano, and violin. He had begun playing professionally, accompanying silent films by 1917 and later at a casino in Colón, Panama.

In 1919, he won $3,000 in a lottery and used it to move to the United States, with his mother and sister, settling in New Orleans, Louisiana, where he worked as a pianist. He moved to Chicago, Illinois, in 1925 and worked with Doc Cook and King Oliver. The Oliver band moved to New York City, and Russell left to form his own band. By 1929, Russell's band became one of the leading jazz groups in New York City. It had several former Oliver sidemen. Performers in his band included trumpeter Red Allen, trombonist J. C. Higginbotham, and alto saxophonist Albert Nicholas. Louis Armstrong took over the band in 1935.

Between 1926 and 1934, Russell recorded 38 sides (mostly using his own name), plus those issued under Red Allen (1929) and a handful where Armstrong led his band. After the OKeh contract ended in September 1930, Russell recorded a handful of sessions for Melotone, Brunswick and Victor. After no recordings under his name between late 1931 and late 1934, Russell recorded a session for ARC (Melotone, Perfect, Oriole, Banner, Romeo) in 1934, which yielded six sides (three featured Sonny Woods's novelty vocals, one featured the vocal group the Palmer Brothers).

The band returned to Russell's name, while Armstrong played in California and Europe in the early 1930s; Russell and Armstrong were reunited in 1935. That same year, Armstrong took over the orchestra altogether, and for the next eight years they functioned as back-up band for Armstrong, with Russell acting as the musical director. 

Russell led a new band from 1943 to 1948 that played at the Savoy and Apollo and made a few recordings. These included his 1946 version of the pop standard, "The Very Thought of You". In 1948, Russell retired from music and opened a notions shop, with irregular band gigs and teaching music on the side.  In 1959, he visited Panama where he gave a piano recital of classical music.

He died in New York City at the age of 61.  His daughter, Catherine Russell, is a jazz singer.

Selected discography
As leader
 1929–1934 (2-CD, Retrieval Records [2006])
 Saratoga Shout (ASV Living Era [2007])

With Louis Armstrong
 Louis & Luis, 1929–1940 (ASV Living Era [1994])

References

External links
Luis Russell at RedHotJazz.com

1902 births
1963 deaths
American jazz bandleaders
American jazz pianists
American male pianists
Big band bandleaders
Big band pianists
Deaths from cancer in New York (state)
Jazz musicians from New Orleans
Swing pianists
Manor Records artists
20th-century American pianists
Panamanian emigrants to the United States
20th-century American male musicians
American male jazz musicians